The Brazilian Mathematical Olympiad of Public Schools (OBMEP) is an annual Mathematics contest created in 2005 by the Brazilian Ministério da Ciência e Tecnologia (MCT) and Ministério da Educação (MEC), in collaboration with Instituto Nacional de Matemática Pura e Aplicada (IMPA) and Sociedade Brasileira de Matemática (SBM), to stimulate the mathematics education in Brazil. It is open to public school students from fifth grade to high school. In 2014 more than 18 million students were enrolled for its first round.

References

External links 
 Official site

See also
 Olimpíada Brasileira de Matemática

Brazilian education awards
Mathematics competitions